The 2019 Melton Borough Council election took place on 2 May 2019 to elect members of the Melton Borough Council in England. It was held on the same day as other local elections.

Summary

Election result

|-

Ward results

Asfordby

Bottesford

Croxton Kerrial

Frisby on the Wreake

Gaddesby

Long Clawson and Stathern

Melton Craven

Melton Dorian

Melton Egerton

Melton Newport

Melton Sysonby

Melton Warwick

Old Dalby

Somerby

Waltham on the Wolds

Wymondham

By-elections

Melton Dorian

Melton Sysonby

References

2019 English local elections
May 2019 events in the United Kingdom
2019
2010s in Leicestershire